The Jataka tales are a voluminous body of literature concerning the stories of previous births of Gautama Buddha. Following is the list of Jataka tales mentioned in Buddhist literature or mythology. The tales are dated between 300 BC and 400 AD.

In Pali Canon 
The Jātakas are found as a textual division of the Pāli Canon called Jātakapāḷi, included in the Khuddaka Nikaya of the Sutta Pitaka.

In Arya Śura's Jatakamala 
The Jātaka-Mālā of Arya Śura in Sanskrit gives 34 Jātaka stories.

Pannasa Jataka 

The Paññāsa Jātaka is a non-canonical collection of 50 stories of the Buddha's past lives.

In Mahavastu 
The Mahāvastu is a Vinaya text of the Lokottaravāda school of Early Buddhism. Over half of the text is composed of Jātaka and Avadāna tales.

Haribhatta's Jatakamala 
Haribhatta's Jatakamala presents thirty-four accounts of the Buddha's past lives. Some of them are:

Gallery 
Here are images illustrating some of the scenes from the Jataka tales:

See also 

 Jataka tales
 Mahanipata Jataka
 Pannasa Jataka

References 

Jatakas